In astrology, accidental dignity occurs when a planet gains strength for any reason other than its zodiacal position. Accidental dignity should not be confused with essential dignity which is where a planet gains strength from its position in the zodiac. To understand the difference between accidental dignity and essential dignity, think of essential dignity as being relevant to the 'nature' of the planet and accidental dignity as relevant to how that planet 'finds itself', or its 'power to act'. As an example, in a horary question, the significator for a lost valuable ring may have good essential dignity (it is valuable), but may have little accidental dignity (it is lost).

A planet can gain accidental dignity through a number of ways, but most often it is gained when the planet is found on an angle (Ascendant, Midheaven, Descendant, IC), being direct, swift in motion, free from combustion or being Cazimi, in a beneficial aspect to a fortunate planet or conjunct a fixed star of a fortunate nature.
 
Essential and accidental dignity have particular importance in some branches of astrology, such as horary and electional astrology.

Accidental Debility 
Conversely planets may also lose accidental dignity and become accidentally debilitated. Several factors may contribute to a planet being accidentally debilitated, including the planet being: slower than its average speed, retrograde, combust or aspecting a malefic planet or fixed star.

Accidental Dignity by House Association 

Traditional astrology regarded house rulerships differently than what is currently en vogue in modern (Western) astrology. The bulk of traditional house rulership followed the Chaldean planetary ordering system, whereas modern astrologers tend to align the house rulers in the same order that they define the sign rulers.

References

Technical factors of Western astrology